Das Amt was a German comedy television series which aired between 1997 and 2002 on RTL. It was created by Dietmar Jacobs.

External links
 

German comedy television series
1997 German television series debuts
2002 German television series endings
RTL (German TV channel) original programming
German-language television shows